Andrew Bryan may refer to:

 Andrew Bryan (Baptist) (1737–1812), founded the First African Baptist Church of Savannah in Savannah, Georgia
 Sir Andrew Bryan (engineer) (1893–1988), Scottish mining engineer
 Andrew Bryan (cricketer) (born 1964), former English cricketer
 Andrew J. Bryan (1848–1921), American architect

See also  
 Andrew Bryant (disambiguation)